This is a list of national parks in Albania which includes 14 national parks and a marine park. The national policy for governing and management of the national parks is implemented by the Ministry of Environment of Albania.

List of national parks in Albania

See also 

 Protected areas of Albania
 Geography of Albania

References 

Albania
 
National parks
National parks